Nueva Ecija's 3rd congressional district is one of the four congressional districts of the Philippines in the province of Nueva Ecija. It has been represented in the House of Representatives since 1987. The district consists of the provincial capital city Palayan, its largest city Cabanatuan, and adjacent municipalities, namely Bongabon, Gabaldon, General Mamerto Natividad, Laur and Santa Rosa. It is currently represented in the 19th Congress by Rosanna Vergara of the PDP–Laban.

Representation history

Election results

2022

2019

2016

2013

2010

See also
Legislative districts of Nueva Ecija

References

Congressional districts of the Philippines
Politics of Nueva Ecija
1987 establishments in the Philippines
Congressional districts of Central Luzon
Constituencies established in 1987